Kathleen Fitzpatrick may refer to:

 Kathleen Fitzpatrick (Australian academic) (1905–1990), Australian professor and historian
 Kathleen Fitzpatrick (American academic) (born 1967), American digital humanities scholar
 Kathleen M. Fitzpatrick, American diplomat

See also
 Catherine A. Fitzpatrick
 Fitzpatrick (surname)
 Fitzpatrick (disambiguation)